Pride, is a supervillain team appearing in American comic books published by Marvel Comics. The characters are depicted as a criminal organization that controlled the Los Angeles area of the Marvel Universe. They are the parents and the initial and most prominent foes the Runaways have faced and are the team's greatest enemy to date. The Pride consists of six couples—the mafia-controlling Wilders, the time-traveling Yorkeses, the telepathic mutant Hayeses, the alien invader Deans, the mad scientist Steins, and the dark wizard Minorus.

Pride, was often considered to be an efficient super-villain team that barred other villains from controlling Los Angeles. Although the real world did not know of Pride's existence. Mafia mob bosses who did, such as the Kingpin, admitted the group ran Los Angeles with efficiency and vision. The Pride first appeared in Runaways #1, published by Marvel Comics in 2003, and was created by Brian K. Vaughan and Adrian Alphona.

Pride also appeared in Hulu's television series Runaways set in the Marvel Cinematic Universe, where most of them are presented as caring parents who act out of a desire to protect their children from a greater threat.

Origin

Original Pride
Although the Pride was the center of focus throughout the first volume of the series, their actual origin was only covered in the 13th issue. The six couples were called together in 1985 by the Gibborim, three mythical giants who had ruled the world when it had "originally been one, serene utopia". The Gibborim informed the couples (who revealed themselves to be aliens, time-travellers, magicians, scientists, mutants, and criminals) that they desired to turn the world into the same peaceful utopia it had been millions of years before, but did not have the strength. The Gibborim required the six couples' help ("a Pride") to wipe out the entire planet, and when they achieved their goal, six of the twelve who served them the best would be able to rule the world with them, while the other six would perish with the rest of the human race. The couples agreed, and formed The Pride.

The Gibborim required a sacrifice every year for twenty-five years in order to get their strength. During this time, the Gibborim rewarded The Pride with wealth and with enhancements to their natural abilities and powers so they could rule over Los Angeles, to a point where Norman Osborn calls them "the dominant and most feared criminal organization of the West Coast". Every year, The Pride gathered at the Wilder residence, using the excuse of an "annual charity fundraiser", while in reality, they would perform the "Rite of Blood", the ritual sacrifice of an innocent young female victim; the spirit of the victim would then be fed to the Gibborim in the "Rite of Thunder".

After Janet Stein became pregnant during their third year as a group, the Pride agreed to end its struggle against one another. Instead of half the couples surviving, they would instead have one child, with those children receiving the six places in the coming paradise, allowing the Pride's legacy to go on. Unbeknownst to the rest of the Pride, the Deans and the Hayes had made a deal: to murder the rest of the Pride and take the six tickets to paradise for themselves and their daughters, Karolina Dean and Molly Hayes, considering themselves superior to the other four families due to their natural abilities compared to the others' reliance on technology and tools.

When Obadiah Stane took his company, Tony Stark relocated to Los Angeles after saving a homeless man with psychological problems, but unintentionally attracted the attention of the Pride who believed that he had come to Los Angeles specifically to confront them. Despite their attempts to eliminate Stark by hiring the Serpent Society to kill him, Tony was able to assemble a new company called Imperio Techworks, convincing the locals to invest (with the new Iron Man acquiring Japanese investors after defeating a monster), which prompts Wilder to send Tony a message about his presence in the city. Unfortunately for Wilder, his actions resulted in Stark learning about the existence of the Pride; prior to this, all Stark knew was that the Serpent Society had been sent after him by a bald man, leading to the logical assumption that their attacks against him were organized by Stane. Although he was able to defeat and imprison the Pride with the aid of the Illuminati when they tried to confront him directly, Stark knew that he couldn't hold his "territory" once the Pride were out of prison as they were too well-connected. With that in mind, Tony handed Imperio Techworks over to one of his employees and departed after leaving Geoffrey Wilder a message; if the Pride left Imperio alone, Tony would not bring in virtually every superhuman contact he possessed to attack them.

Seventeen years after the Steins announced their pregnancy, the Pride's children inadvertently see the Rite of Blood and run away. With assistance of LAPD Lieutenant Flores, their parents frame their children for the murder of the innocent girl who served as their most recent sacrifice. A note left at the Deans' house reveals that one of the Runaways is secretly loyal to the Pride. The mole within the Runaways tips off the Pride about their involvement with Cloak and Dagger and alerts the Pride of their new hideout, forcing the Runaways to escape.

During a ceremony at the Rite of Thunder, Alex obtains Nico's Staff of One, Chase's Fistigons and Gertrude's dinosaur (Old Lace), manipulating his teammates into defeat and revealing himself as the mole. In reality, he also discovered the Deans' and Hayeses' betrayal.

Alex manipulated the Runaways as a way of taking the six tickets in paradise for himself, his parents, Nico and her parents. Nico brutally refuses his offer, beating up Alex in the process. Within seconds, the other Runaways retrieve their stolen items from Alex. Molly crushes the container carrying the soul of the latest girl sacrificed, the Gibborim destroy Alex, and the undersea lair in which they offer the soul collapses, trapping The Pride inside. Right before the lair collapses, the rest of the Pride finally learns of the Deans and Hayeses betrayal.

The Runaways assume the Pride is dead, even though no bodies were found.

With their defeat, the activities and the true extent of the Pride's influence in L.A. is reported to the public, leading to a slew of indictments, most notably within law enforcement ranging from theft to homicide. A news report three months later announces that the government is refusing to reveal any detail about the Pride or the Runaways (who are now known to the public as the Pride's children and vanquishers).

"New Pride"
At the end of issue #6 in the second series, a figure who had impersonated Chamber from the X-Men, is implied to be a resurrected Alex Wilder, and has formed a new Pride using some of the original team's tools, including the Minorus' Chameleon Glamour, a small talisman to disguise the user into any form. They had later used the Minorus' Eye-Spy Cauldron to spy on the Runaways, who had left from New York City and were returning to Los Angeles. They had also obtained the Steins' copy of the Abstract. It was later revealed that they were a group of Alex's former online friends on a role-playing game consisting of Stretch, Hunter, Lotus, and Oscar.

After they were revealed to be the "new Pride", Hunter hacked into Alex's game account, and through that eventually found his computer's journal and learned about Pride. After Alex's death, the friends find certain items from Pride in an attempt to bring back Alex, but end up killing Oscar, and bringing back a younger version of Alex's father Geoffrey from a time period of one year after joining Pride. Geoffrey then lied to the new Pride acting as the "good guy" and saying that the Runaways killed Alex. Ironically, the new Pride formed because Alex's friends claimed that they wanted to become more "responsible members of society", and begin acting like adults, the Runaways' philosophy states that no adults are to be trusted.

Geoffrey Wilder murders Gertrude Yorkes as part of a sacrificial ritual, but he is captured and returned to his own time (with his memory erased in the process) the new Pride disbands after the Runaways reveal Geoffrey Wilder's true goal. Following Gert's death, Stretch checks himself into a mental health facility, and Hunter joins the Peace Corps to atone for the "blood" on his hands. Lotus is kidnapped (or, as she puts it, "hired") by Chase Stein to help him resurrect Gert. When the attempt fails, Chase releases Lotus, telling her to burn her copy of the Abstract.

Alex Wilder's Pride
Alex Wilder starts a third incarnation of Pride where he has gotten known Harlem crime lords Black Mariah, Cottonmouth, Dontrell "Cockroach" Hamilton, Gamecock and some unnamed people to join him. Alex later approached Tombstone and Mr. Fish where he tells them about his father's group and that he is starting a new incarnation of Pride in Harlem. Afterwards, Alex beats up Tombstone and banishes Mr. Fish to Hell.

Members

Original members
Despite Pride's allegiance to one another, rifts and alliances had been common amongst the group. The most notable of the alliances was the Hayeses and the Deans, who had plotted to betray the other remaining Pride members because they were human. All members of the Pride are given nicknames by the Gibborim.

The Wilder family
Geoffrey and Catherine Wilder ("the Thieves") are Alex Wilder's parents. They are crime bosses who posed as businesspeople. They handled illegal drug trade, gambling and robbery in Los Angeles. For this, these two established strong and powerful connections throughout Los Angeles, a reason the Pride is able to frame their kids for kidnap and murder. Geoffrey had led the entire Pride. Geoffrey originally appeared as a stern and demeaning man, who had forbade his son from playing online roleplaying games. His cool persona is often distinguished, meaning other characters can detect his attitude, as evidenced when Nico is able to identify a 1985 version of Geoffrey. When the Gibborim had called them to the first meeting, Geoffrey and Catherine had been on the run from the cops, after a fresh robbery, where it was revealed that Geoffrey and Catherine had eloped, defying Catherine's mother's wishes. Originally appearing as average parents, it is shown the two can also have short tempers; when one of the Pride's agents informed Geoffrey that their children had run away, Geoffrey carried a dagger to Alex's room; Catherine later shot the same agent in the knee.

Geoffrey Wilder returns, after a group unintentionally brings a 1985 version of him back from his time. He was later defeated and returned to his time with his memory wiped by Nico.

The Yorkes family
Dale and Stacey Yorkes ("the Travelers") are Gertrude Yorkes's parents. They are time travellers who posed as antique dealers. The two, using a special 4-D portal, had traveled all over time, and had commissioned a genetically engineered dinosaur, mentally linking it with their daughter. They had lived in the 87th century. When the Gibborim had called them to the first meeting, Dale and Stacey had accidentally landed in 1985, where Stacey quotes was "the worst decade of the century". They believed the Gibborim would make a better world, one that wasn't full of superheroes who had foiled their plans in the past (and presumably the future). The two have a distinct way of speech (unlike the rest of the Pride, they have older-fashioned speech), and often imply they know what will go on in the future. They dress in pilot styles resembling that of Amelia Earhart, complete with the goggles, scarves, and gloves. It was later revealed their outfits were actually technical advances; their gloves cause fire and restraining shields. The Yorkes appear as self-righteous, obnoxious people, particularly Stacey. Gert had had a strong dislike of her parents because of an incident involving Gert's pet pig, which the Yorkes hated; after Gert had been playing with it, she had briefly left to answer the phone, and when she returned, she found it gone.  She suspected her parents of the disappearance.

When the runaways are time-displaced to 1907, it was revealed the runaways had landed in a time the Yorkes were visiting, where the Yorkes are the heads of a super powered street gang known as the Sinners. When Chase reveals Gert is dead to Dale, he snaps, prompting him to almost assault Chase with his fiery gloves. Later on, Dale reveals the Yorkes have several kingdoms through time, and plan on destroying all of 1907 New York for the sake of their daughter. Unable to wipe their memories as she had already used that spell, Nico stops the Yorkes with her most complex spell yet ("The show must go on"), revealing a painful secret about the Yorkes: the Yorkes will remember everything they now know about their daughter's upcoming death as well as their own, but are enchanted to be unable to act on this knowledge in any way, even to each other; they cannot change the future or say anything that would cause a Grandfather Paradox.

The Dean family
Frank and Leslie Dean ("the Colonists") are Karolina Dean's parents. They are alien invaders from Majesdane (the homeworld of their race) who posed as Hollywood actors. The Deans are intergalactic arms traders to the Skrulls. In their alien form, they appear humanoid with bright, wispy skin, and can manipulate and control solar energy for a variety of purposes. When the Gibborim had called the Deans for the first meeting, the Deans were on a Hollywood set for their show, General Hospital. The two had inhibited Karolina's alien powers for most of her life by way of a medical alert bracelet that was forged from far-distant metal, telling her she had an allergy to penicillin. Frank had included Karolina in his will with a paper instructing her to take off the bracelet, but Karolina had discovered the will early. Frank and Leslie had originally appeared as a happy, smiling couple that complimented Karolina's special powers, but as issues went on, it was shown the two would have violent and warlike tempers; when the runaways battle their parents over Molly Hayes, Leslie appears rather viciously, returning every time she was knocked out; when Frank arrived from New York and discovered his daughter had already left home and discovered her powers, he had violently attacked Victor Stein roaring for his daughter. The Deans also were the only ones that didn't want a child. However, Leslie eventually believed that a child would put them on People magazine's cover. The Deans had conspired with the Hayeses to kill the rest of the Pride and take the six tickets in paradise for the two couples and their daughters.

When on the run, Karolina meets Xavin, an alien, and more about the Deans is revealed: the Deans had actually been exiled from their planet for criminal activities; the two immigrated to Earth where they took their last name from a memorial of James Dean. When Prince De'zean of the Skrulls had arrived at Earth to conquer it, Frank and Leslie had stopped him. In exchange, the two gave the Skrulls the coordinates of a much more valuable planet: Majesdane, the Deans' birth planet, which was hidden beneath a white dwarf star. To assure the Skrulls the coordinates were real, the Deans offered the prince their daughter's hand in marriage; therefore, Karolina was engaged to the son of the prince, Xavin. The Skrulls then left to destroy Majesdane, culminating in a fifteen-year war. The Deans had privately believed that Xavin would die in the war and wouldn't come to collect the marriage agreement. More recently, Karolina had a dream involving both her parents; in a split image, Leslie pulled Karolina to Earth, while Frank pulled Karolina to a milky ball that was Majesdane. It was later revealed by vaDanti, a Majesdanian soldier, that it was specifically Frank Dean who told the Skrulls where Majesdane was hidden.

Daken, the psychopathic son of Wolverine, invades Los Angeles with the hope of usurping the void left by the Pride. He begins taking drugs that are mixed with Majesdanian blood, referred to as "Heat Pills" but unaware it's costing him his abilities.

The Stein family
Victor and Janet Stein ("the Wise Men") are Chase Stein's parents. They are world-renowned brilliant inventors (Tony Stark was once impressed by their work) who are known for making fortunes for what people believe are necessities. They also made "weaponized" gloves called Fistigons, multi-spectral goggles and the transport ship "the Leapfrog". When the Gibborim had called them for the first meeting, the Steins were in their laboratory. At the back of the Stein home is their workshop, which appears as a small shed. When entered, the space is equal to that of a large cave. The Steins are also responsible for the money the Pride obtains, as Victor revealed he and Janet had counterfeited the new fifty dollar bill within two minutes. The Steins have also created watches that zap electricity, watches that scan police radars and senses, creating the container that carries the soul they sacrifice, and they dress in scientific outfits for their villainous costumes. Janet Stein's pregnancy is the reason the remaining Pride wished to have children, and started the idea of offering their place to a child. Victor is the one parent often described as being the most abusive, as he first appears punching Chase across the face for getting C's, with Janet scolding slightly. A remark from Chase implies that his father regularly beats him. Chase later quotes his parents often argue. On the night of the Rite of Thunder, Victor tells Geoffrey that he really loves his son, and Janet later admits she doesn't know how her soul is, because of the murders.

When Chase receives an opportunity to bring Gert back to life, he immediately agrees to take it: sacrifice an innocent life and Gert would return alive.  Chase agrees to the deal and wishes to sacrifice himself, because he had realized he was innocent; Victor would often abuse Chase when he was young, hitting him with a Burbank phone book, which Chase quotes as "strong enough to hurt but not leave any marks". Janet would then put on the radio, so she wouldn't hear her son crying downstairs. Victor would hurt him for getting a D in Algebra, a parking ticket, or even if he was just having a bad day. Chase had never thought of them as good excuses, so he had begun to make up his own, and even believe them, until he realized that he was entirely innocent.

The Hayes family
Gene and Alice Hayes ("the Outcasts") are Molly Hayes' parents. The two are telepathic mutants who posed as doctors. Gene first appears as a very awkward man, unwilling to talk about his daughter's puberty. Alice is described a strong and caring mother, but still able to offer up her own daughter as a ransom to capture the five other runaways. When the Gibborim had called the Hayes for the first meeting, Gene and Alice had been getting harassed by the neighbors, who had thrown rocks at them for being mutants. Just before a furious Gene was about to protect a whimpering Alice, the two had been called forth by the Gibborim. This led to the Hayeses' strong hatred towards humans, a reason they were willing to conspire with the Deans to kill the human members of the Pride and ensure the six tickets in paradise for themselves, Molly, and the three Deans. It was revealed early on that the Hayes had no idea Molly was a mutant herself, Molly having tested negative for the mutant gene, but when Molly's supposed puberty was actually her mutant genes kicking in, the Hayes were shocked. The two are telepaths, capable of memory removal and sedation, but this has been reversed on at least one occasion—when they had wiped Cloak's memory of ever encountering the Runaways, Cloak and Dagger traveled back to New York, where after receiving a blow to the head, Cloak remembered.

Molly had difficulty in believing her parents were villains for two main reasons: because of her age, and her strong empowering belief her parents were actually innocent people. After Molly had escaped a villain named "the Provost", Molly rescued several other runaway children who had thought their parents villains and offered them a place on the team.  When they rejected and said they would go to their families, Molly later had a dream of her parents, reminding her they would still be going to Disneyland, and Molly admitting to her dream-mother that her whole experience as a runaway was a horrible nightmare. The dream-Alice comforts Molly by telling her it was nothing but a dream, and not to worry, because she's home.

Emma Frost later mentions that she knew the Hayeses; The Hellfire Club had originally reached out for them, but the Hayeses refused. Frost tells Cyclops that the Hayeses were monsters and suggested that Molly was probably better off without them. Later, Molly and her chaperone Wolverine are captured by a super-villain seeking revenge against the Hayeses for stopping his bid for Pride territory and brutally massacring his men and sadistically torturing him seven years previously. He happily confronts Molly with the reality of her parents' evil and sadism, telling her that her parents allegedly killed many people, including children, often for no reason and took pleasure in torturing them. He plans on exacting his revenge by killing Molly, though Wolverine manages to defeat him. Afterward, Wolverine comforts her, stating that her parents must have truly loved her despite being super-villains, though Molly accepts that they were "bad people" and realizes that she will never see her parents in the same light as before.

When Molly is sent to stay with her grandmother after the team disbands, she learns that this grandmother was her direct maternal grandmother, who had taken in Molly's father when he ran away, and carried out various genetic research to give Molly's parents their powers, accounting for how Molly's parents could share the same mutant power. Molly's grandmother eventually reveals her true agenda to try and genetically recreate Molly's dead parents, but Molly rejects this idea, choosing instead to return to the Runaways as the team come back together.

The Minoru family
Robert and Tina Minoru ("the Magicians") are Nico Minoru's parents. The two are dark wizards who posed as an average, church-going, middle-class couple. The two are the least-liked by the Pride; in a holograph, it's revealed the Steins and Yorkes consider them unstable because they're magicians; the Deans and Hayes hate them because they're humans; Geoffrey Wilder also criticizes Robert on one occasion. When the Gibborim had first abducted the Pride for the first meeting, the Minorus were on their wedding day. Arriving in the Gibborim's chamber with the rest of the Pride, the two quickly unleashed a black hole of bats at the Pride. In their first appearance, the two appear as an average couple, where Robert is unwilling to be late, and Tina is an Oprah fan.  When the Runaways witness the Rite of Blood, they see that Robert conducts the enchanted spell of sacrifice. The Runaways see the Minorus in action when they get ambushed at the Steins' laboratory; Tina conducts her powers using a mystical Staff known as the "Staff of One", and Robert conducts his powers through a spell book. Tina attempted to stab Nico with the Staff, but, due to Nico's own innate magic and hereditary link with Tina, the Staff was absorbed by Nico, who kept it. It is later hinted that there is more than one Staff of One, as shown when Bo, the first lady to a drug dealer in New York, knew of Nico's incantation and Chase commented that Nico had "a Staff of One." The Minorus, though having mentioned that they only "dabbled" in the dark arts the first time the Pride was gathered, were given enough mystical power by the Gibborim to rule Los Angeles and even beyond. In the final battle with the Pride at the Marine Vivarium, Nico ignored the Wilders' and her parents' wishes to rule in the new world. Regardless, Tina screamed at Nico to run while she and Robert held back the Gibborim, a reason the Runaways were able to flee to safety.

The Minorus are considered highly proficient spellcasters of the dark arts, able to evoke spells of various effects with spoken incantations and without, capable of conjuring bats from nowhere, conducting the Rite of Blood, garbing themselves and others in their costumes, summoning the Staff of One and an enchanted tome (the Abstract), summoning waterspouts, killing a genetically engineered prehistoric creature, teleporting a Majesdanian alien back to his home planetoid in another galaxy, freezing another, even a holder of the Staff of One in time, and project energy blasts of sufficient strength to hold off Elder Gods (if but for moments). The Minorus are involved with various other mystical matters such as Dormammu and Agamotto. Nevertheless, for whatever reason (presumably due to the lack of the Staff of One because Nico stole it), the Minorus appeared incapable, despite their immense power and experience in dark magic, of locating the Runaways, though they were but at most several miles from the Pride.

When the Minorus combine their strength, without the usage of magical artifacts, they are capable of sending Frank Dean back to the planet he came from, while the Sorcerer Supreme Doctor Strange, with access to all his own magical items at the Sanctum Sanctorum, claims he cannot bring the New Avengers to Japan through any magical means.

Robert and Tina later appear in a dream that Nico has, where the two criticize Nico and call her a slut for kissing Alex, Chase, Topher, and Victor. Nico then overcomes her previous insecurities by quickly killing her parents in her dream by screaming a spell, "and I liked you better dead!"

The Minorus are mentioned to Nico by Marie LaVeau, who reveals that they were acquaintances of hers, and that they were never fully committed to the Dark Path, only to the Pride, unlike Marie. Marie claims to Nico that the Minorus used her, gained her trust, and betrayed her, taking the valuable and extraordinarily powerful Black Mirror from her. The Mirror possessed the ability to gaze into other dimensions, and even the power to travel through time, "if used correctly." Maries scathingly adds certain members of the Pride, such as the Yorkes, had access to the secrets of time traveling, which were shared not with the Minoru clan. The Minorus were so determined to learn about their own past and family secrets they used the Mirror to do so. Yet whatever vision they saw, it was so terrifying even they were unnerved and magically sealed the Mirror so none could ever use it again, instead causing a mere reflection to stare back at the beholder. Nico is told Marie requires her blood to unlock the Mirror's locking spell, and Nico herself does so, though also, as she intended, releases the Staff of One. Nico engages Marie in direct magical combat, and triumphs. However, after Nico unsuccessfully tries to utilize the power of the Mirror to revive Alex Wilder, Marie finds the last page of the Darkhold, and promises Nico that they will encounter each other again, leaving the teenage witch to stare at the shattered remains of the Black Mirror, indeed a mirror of her own life at the time.

After their death, their influence still lives on—the "New Pride" found their magical runestone as part of the ritual to summon Geoffrey Wilder to their present time, and uses more of their magical artifacts to their benefit, such as the Eye-Spy Cauldron to spy upon the Runaways and the chameleon glamour charm Wilder utilized to conceal his true identity by magically giving himself the voice and physical appearance of Chamber and Alex Wilder. The Minorus have also curiously made mention to the Spine of Agamotto, a benevolent powerful magical being who is the main patron of the Sorcerer Supreme and creator of the Eye of Agamotto to install a "lummox" as Los Angeles's governor. Nico also assumed the security daemons in their hostel were among the old defense spells of the Minorus, and according to her, the Silver Bullet Gang (a gang of werewolves) were actually driven out from Los Angeles by her parents.

Monk Theppie, an ally of Val Rhymin mentions Robert Minoru, his (presumed late) friend, once said that all things are possible, and says he misses the Minorus, appearing near tears when he thinks of them, and saying that the L.A. magic scene has not been the same without them: "Good times." This past relationship to the Minorus is also revealed to Nico when the two confront.

Former agents
 Lieutenant Flores–A member of the LAPD. Shot in the leg by Catherine Wilder for bringing Cloak and Dagger to L.A. and then killed by Geoffrey Wilder after he failed to capture the children.
 Alex Wilder–He was revealed to be a spy for his parents and the rest of the Pride. Killed by the Gibborim.

"New Pride"
 Stretch–An overweight boy who lives with his grandmother (had role-played as several female and scantily clad superheroes such has Emma Frost, Ms. Marvel, and Invisible Woman). Armed with a sword made of the same alien metal as Karolina's medical bracelet, he had himself institutionalized after leaving the group.
 Hunter–A thin young man with a stereotypical slacker appearance (had role-played as the Hulk). He was a hacker with enough skill to hack not only the Leapfrog, but Victor's systems. He joined the Peace Corps to atone for his evil deeds.
 Lotus–A female fantasy fan who participates in Renaissance Fairs (had role-played as Daredevil). Given several mystical artifacts, she was the magic user of the group. She chose to return to her everyday life in an attempt to overcome her own personal demons.
  Oscar–A man who often was fired from many jobs because of using the computers for online games (had role-played as Spider-Man).

Alex Wilder's Pride
 Alex Wilder – Leader
 Black Mariah – 
 Cottonmouth - 
 Dontrell "Cockroach" Hamilton – 
 Scimitar –
 Gamecock –

Other versions

House of M
The Pride is mentioned as ruling Southern California in the House of M reality. Unlike the mainstream reality, their children stay with their parents.

In other media

Film
Though not mentioned by name, Tina Minoru appears briefly in Doctor Strange, portrayed by Linda Louise Duan. She is depicted as being part of the Ancient One's sect.

Television
Pride appears in the Runaways TV series with Catherine Wilder portrayed by Angel Parker, Geoffrey Wilder portrayed by Ryan Sands, Leslie Dean portrayed by Annie Wersching, Frank Dean portrayed by Kip Pardue, Janet Stein portrayed by Ever Carradine, Victor Stein portrayed by James Marsters, Stacey Yorkes portrayed by Brigid Brannagh, Dale Yorkes portrayed by Kevin Weisman, Tina Minoru portrayed by Brittany Ishibashi, Robert Minoru portrayed by James Yaegashi, Gene Hernandez portrayed by Vladimir Caamaño and Alice Hernandez portrayed by Carmen Serano. This version of Pride formed out of necessity as opposed to personal reasons as their benefactor Jonah (played by Julian McMahon) has them blackmailed into helping him, with the sacrifices channeling the life energy of the victims to Jonah rather than the victims being explicitly killed and their souls trapped. Their backgrounds are more grounded in that they do not possess any superpowers with many of their known activities being possible through means of science. The Hernandezes died prior to the events of the show and Frank Dean is not a full time member and slightly unaware of the Pride's activities. At the end of season two, Frank is locked away by the Church of Gibborim while season three, saw the death of Catherine, Janet's mind getting converted into an AI and Robert getting hospitalized from severe injuries, leaving his fate unknown.

Video games
The Pride appears in Lego Marvel Super Heroes 2. They appear in the "Runaways" DLC.

References

External links
 Pride at Marvel.com
 Pride at Marvel Wiki
 Pride at Comic Vine
 Runaways the comic The Pride Information Page
 Runaways.mergingminds.org

Characters created by Brian K. Vaughan
Comics characters introduced in 2003
Marvel Comics supervillain teams